Marbletown is an unincorporated community in Fulton County, Illinois, United States. Marbletown is located on Illinois Route 100 north of Bluff City.

References

Unincorporated communities in Fulton County, Illinois
Unincorporated communities in Illinois